The 2003 Richmond Spiders football team represented the University of Richmond during the 2003 NCAA Division I-AA football season. Richmond competed as a member of the Atlantic 10 Conference (A-10), and played their home games at the University of Richmond Stadium.

The Spiders were led by ninth-year head coach Jim Reid and finished the regular season with a 2–9 overall record and 1–8 record in conference play.

Schedule

References

Richmond
Richmond Spiders football seasons
Richmond Spiders football